Orsonwelles malus is a species of spider endemic to Kauai in the Hawaiian Islands. It was described 2002, although the first individual of O. malus was collected in the 1890s. With individuals exceeding , it is the largest species in the family Linyphiidae. Females range from 8.93 to 14.07 mm in total length (length of carapace + abdomen) while males range from 8.74 to 10.66 mm.

References

Linyphiidae
Spiders described in 2002
Spiders of Hawaii
Endemic fauna of Hawaii
Biota of Kauai